Cymindis quadrimaculata is a species of ground beetle in the subfamily Harpalinae. It was described by L. Redtenbacher in 1844.

References

quadrimaculata
Beetles described in 1844